The Moon-Airel Formation is a geological formation in France. It dates back to the late Rhaetian and early Hettangian.

Vertebrate paleofauna

See also 
 List of dinosaur-bearing rock formations

References 

Geologic formations of France
Triassic System of Europe
Triassic France
Jurassic System of Europe
Jurassic France
Early Jurassic Europe
Hettangian Stage
Rhaetian Stage
Limestone formations
Shale formations
Paleontology in France